Glenwood is a suburb of Timaru, in the South Canterbury area and Canterbury region of New Zealand's South Island. It is located west of the town centre.

Demographics

Glenwood had a population of 1,788 at the 2018 New Zealand census, an increase of 33 people (1.9%) since the 2013 census, and an increase of 132 people (8.0%) since the 2006 census. There were 723 households. There were 873 males and 915 females, giving a sex ratio of 0.95 males per female. The median age was 42.5 years (compared with 37.4 years nationally), with 339 people (19.0%) aged under 15 years, 276 (15.4%) aged 15 to 29, 771 (43.1%) aged 30 to 64, and 399 (22.3%) aged 65 or older.

Ethnicities were 85.9% European/Pākehā, 10.7% Māori, 2.0% Pacific peoples, 8.2% Asian, and 1.2% other ethnicities (totals add to more than 100% since people could identify with multiple ethnicities).

The proportion of people born overseas was 15.8%, compared with 27.1% nationally.

Although some people objected to giving their religion, 44.8% had no religion, 44.0% were Christian, 0.5% were Hindu, 0.7% were Muslim, 0.5% were Buddhist and 2.2% had other religions.

Of those at least 15 years old, 186 (12.8%) people had a bachelor or higher degree, and 354 (24.4%) people had no formal qualifications. The median income was $27,800, compared with $31,800 nationally. The employment status of those at least 15 was that 660 (45.5%) people were employed full-time, 216 (14.9%) were part-time, and 36 (2.5%) were unemployed.

References

Suburbs of Timaru
Populated places in Canterbury, New Zealand